Seattle Preparatory School, popularly known as Seattle Prep, is a private, Jesuit high school located on Capitol Hill in Seattle, Washington.

Curriculum
Students generally pursue a traditional four-year course of study at Seattle Prep and then pursue other arrangements (entrance into a four-year college, or a two-year college).

Arts 
After a first year of Music, Drama, Visual Art, and Media Literacy, students can pick their art courses for the following three years. Some courses offered are: Choir, Filmmaking, Acting, Music Ensemble, Drawing, Printmaking, Photography, Ceramics and AP Studio Art.

Math 
After taking an Algebra placement test, Freshmen are placed in various classes depending on their scores. The classes they can take are: Intermediate Algebra, Geometry, Honors Geometry, Algebra 2/Trigonometry, and Honors Algebra 2/Trigonometry.

Depending on the student's performance in the first semester, they are recommended classes for their Sophomore year, which can be: Geometry, Honors Geometry, Algebra 2, Algebra 2/Trigonometry, Honors Algebra 2/Trigonometry, Precalculus and Honors Precalculus.

This process continues for the rest of the curriculum. Classes that Juniors can take are: Algebra 2, Algebra 2/Trigonometry, Honors Algebra 2/Trigonometry, Introduction to Precalculus, Precalculus, Honors Precalculus, Calculus, AP Calculus AB, and AP Calculus BC.

For senior year students can take the following classes: Introduction to Precalculus, Precalculus, Honors Precalculus, Calculus, AP Calculus AB, AP Calculus BC, Multivariable Calculus and AP Statistics.

Science 
Freshmen are placed in Biology or Honors Biology depending on their scores on the HSPT (High School Placement Test) and the school's math placement test. Sophomores are put in either Honors Chemistry, Accelerated Chemistry, or Chemistry. Depending on the classes they took previously, Juniors have the option of going into the following: Physics, AP Environmental Science, Honors Physics, AP Biology, and AP Chemistry. Seniors can take, Anatomy & Physiology, AP Environmental Science, Honors Physics, AP Biology, or AP Physics C.

Extracurricular activities 
A wide variety of extracurricular activities are offered at Seattle Prep including: Film Club, Chess Team, Mock Trial, Dance Team (known as Pulse), Yearbook, Newspaper, ASB, and Drama Club. Prep also has various social justice clubs including: Global Justice Coalition, Feminist Interest Group (FIG), One Voice, Asian Pacific Islanders Club (APIC), Black Student Union (BSU) and LatinX Club.

Admissions are based on grades, extracurricular activities, an entrance exam, reference letters, and essays, among other criteria.

Facts and figures
Facts and figures (as of 2008):

 Enrollment: 667                                                           
 Faculty: 125
 Faculty with advanced degrees: 90%
 Student/Teacher Ratio: 9.5:1
 Average Class Size: 13
 Percentage of College-Bound Graduates: 99%
 Tuition: $21,950 + $600 Application fee
 Library Volumes: 20,000+
 Tuition Assistance: 1,000,000

Magis Christian Service
Seattle Prep has a 4-year requirement of various community service. The four year Magis Christian Service Program at Seattle Prep exposes students to many different forms of service including service to family (freshman), to school (sophomore), to the poor and marginalized (junior), and to leadership for justice (senior).

Physical structure

In the 1950s, McDonnell Hall was added to the existing Adelphia Hall (the name of which refers to Adelphia College, previously on the site), and in the 1960s, Peyton Hall was added across the parking lot from McDonnell and Adelphia Halls. The McHugh Gymnasium was built in front of Adelphia Hall and opened in 1983, a result of the school's first major fundraising campaign. Funds from this campaign were used to remodel the third floor of Adelphia Hall for improved science facilities. During this time the library, which then became known as Loyola Library, was moved to Peyton Hall.

There were several major additions to Seattle Prep in the late 1990s. A new underground parking garage was built to replace the old parking lot, which was replaced by a grass quad. In addition, St. Ignatius Hall was erected across from Peyton and McDonnell Halls.

In 2007, the PACCAR Commons (Donated by the Pigott family) were completed, including new office space with reception desks and also a sick room. Also construction was completed on the Thomas Healy, S.J., Theater and Classrooms.  This was the first major renovation since the addition of St. Ignatius Hall.  The  theater, which also accommodates school Masses, features an orchestra pit with hydraulics moving it up and down for various uses, including the transportation of heavy equipment.  The workout rooms and locker rooms were also altered in this remodel.  The space below the theater is used for arts classes, a sacristy (to be used for liturgies and Masses), and weight/workout rooms. In 2008, sections of pathway around the campus plaza were redone and electronic doors were installed on several major entrances.

Athletics and activities
Seattle Prep has won numerous league and state titles in many different men's sports. As of 2010, by size Prep is a high-end 1A class school, but plays up in 3A classification.

The boys' soccer team are back-to-back state champions (2011 and 2012) and have four other appearances in the state championship game. The team qualified for State 14 years in a row, winning it all in 2002.
Prep's volleyball team won three straight state titles from 2001–03, and returned to the champions circle in 2010.

The boys' basketball team won state titles in 2000 and 2006 and narrowly missed another title in 2012 losing in the state championship game. The team has qualified for State 6 of the last 7 seasons.

The boys' cross country team won the state title in 1966 (led by future 4th-place finisher in the Montreal Olympics marathon Don Kardong), 1972, and 2000. Prep's boys' cross country teams have finished as one of the top five 3A teams every year but one from 1996-2013. During that span, Prep never placed lower than second in the Metro League. In 2006, Prep won its first women's Metro League team title.

The boys' lacrosse team won the Washington High School Boys Lacrosse Association, Division II state championship in 2002 and has made it to the championship game in multiple years.

The Mock Trial program boasts one national championship and 14 state titles over the past 18 years (winning State in 2003, 2004, 2007, 2008, 2009, 2010, 2011, 2012, 2013, 2014, 2015, 2016, 2017, and 2021). Prep has placed in the top-10 at the National High School Mock Trial Championship eight times during that span. Its 3rd-place finish in 2009 was the best in program history, until the program won the national title in 2014.

The Prep Chess Team has played in the Washington High School State Team Championship in each of the past 17 years. Its highest finishes were 2nd (2002), 3rd (2009), 5th (2005 and 2010), and 6th (1999). In 1999, they also won the Metro Championship.

Notable alumni

 Bob Bellinger, American football player
 Bryce Fisher, former NFL defensive lineman (1999–2008) 
 Tom Gorman, former professional tennis player 
 Spencer Hawes, professional NBA basketball player, Milwaukee Bucks
 Don Karr, Olympic marathon runner 
 Amanda Knox, convicted of murdering a fellow student in Italy, conviction later overturned
 Joe Lombardi, NFL offensive coordinator, Detroit Lions
 Mike McGavick, former CEO of Safeco and former Republican candidate for the United States Senate 
 John McKay, former US Attorney for the Western District Of Washington  
 Greg Nickels, former mayor of Seattle (2002–2010) 
 John Spellman, former governor of Washington (1981–1985)  
 Martell Webster, professional NBA basketball player, Washington Wizards

References

Catholic secondary schools in Washington (state)
Jesuit high schools in the United States
Schools in Seattle
High schools in King County, Washington
Educational institutions established in 1891
Schools accredited by the Northwest Accreditation Commission
High schools within the Archdiocese of Seattle
1891 establishments in Washington (state)